Model for assessment of telemedicine (MAST) is a framework for assessment of the value of telemedicine.

Description
Telemedicine services may have many different types of outcomes and can be studied in many ways. In order for those who develop new telemedicine services to produce the information that healthcare managers need for making decisions on investment in telemedicine, a model for assessment of telemedicine (MAST) was developed. This work was done in 2010 through stakeholder workshops and on the basis of a systematic literature review.

If the objective of an assessment of telemedicine applications is to describe effectiveness and contribution to quality of care and to produce a basis for decision making, then MAST defines the relevant assessment framework fulfilling this objective as a multidisciplinary process which summarizes and evaluates information about the medical, social, economic and ethical issues related to the use of telemedicine in a systematic, unbiased, robust manner.

This statement is based on the definition of Health technology assessment (HTA) in the EUnetHTA project. Key concepts are "multidisciplinary" and "systematic, unbiased and robust". The first concept implies that the assessments should include all important outcomes of the applications for patients, clinicians, healthcare institutions and society in general. The others imply that assessments should be based on scientific studies and methods, scientific criteria for quality of evidence and scientific standards for reporting of results, e.g. as described in EQUATOR Network.

Steps
In practice the use of MAST includes three steps:

 Preceding assessment
 Multidisciplinary assessment
 Transferability  assessment

Firstly, the assessment must start with preceding considerations in order to determine whether it is relevant for an institution at a given point in time to carry out the assessment. This step involves mainly assessment of the maturity of the technology and the organization planning to use it. If the technology is not matured and have not been tested in practice, then pilot studies must be carried out to mature the technology before a multidisciplinary study is initiated.

Secondly, after the preceding considerations, the multidisciplinary assessment is carried out in order to describe and assess the different outcomes of the telemedicine application. This involves assessment of outcomes within the following seven domains:
 Domain 1: Health problem and characteristics of the application
 Domain 2: Safety
 Domain 3: Clinical effectiveness
 Domain 4: Patient perspectives
 Domain 5: Economic aspects
 Domain 6: Organizational aspects
 Domain 7: Socio-cultural, ethical and legal aspects

Thirdly, in relation to the description of the outcomes, an assessment should also be made of the transferability of the results to other settings or countries.

Use

MAST is the most widely used framework for assessment of telemedicine in Europe. The model is used in large EU funded telemedicine project like Renewing Health, United4Health, Smartcare and inCASA. These projects include more than 20.000 patients and more than 18 randomised controlled trials. A large number of individual telemedicine projects also use MAST e.g. Patient@home, Durand-Zaleski (2013) and Campos et al. (2013) 

The number of publications of studies using MAST is still limited, but growing. The first clinical studies have been reported by Sorknæs et al. (2013), Karhula et al. (2015) and Rasmussen et al. (2015). Recently a study of the organizational outcomes of implementation of telemedicine was published by Rasmussen et al. (2015).

MAST has also been recommended as a usable structure for assessment of outcomes of telemedicine by the association of Danish Regions Telemedicine strategy, by the British Thoracic Society statement on telemedicine (2014) and within the field of wound care by Angel et al. (2015).

Difference between MAST and EUnetHTA Core model

MAST is based on HTA and the EUnetHTA Core model, but whereas the core model includes 9 domains, MAST only includes 7 domains. This is done by combining the content of several domains into one. MAST has also a separate domain describing the impact of telemedicine on patient perception and thereby underlining the importance of the patients' view of this type of health care technology. In addition the three steps in MAST underline that the assessment of outcomes should be seen in the light of the maturity of the technology and the transferability of the results to other countries.

References

External links
 EUropean network for Health Technology Assessment (EUnetHTA): http://www.eunethta.eu/
 Renewing Health project: http://www.renewinghealth.eu/en/
 United4Health project: http://united4health.eu/
 Patient@home project: http://www.en.patientathome.dk/
 Smart Care project: http://www.pilotsmartcare.eu/home/
 InCASA: http://www.incasa-project.eu/news.php
 MAST manual
 Methotelemed
 Videos on MAST

Telemedicine
Impact assessment
Evidence-based practices
Research methods